James Kelsey may refer to:
 Jim Kelsey, American bishop
 James Kelsey (sculptor), American sculptor